Hoseyn Naju (also Romanized as Ḩoseyn Najū; also known as Kalāteh-ye Ḩoseyn Najū and Nowrūzābād) is a village in Bizaki Rural District, Golbajar District, Chenaran County, Razavi Khorasan Province, Iran. At the 2006 census, its population was 66, in 13 families.

References 

Populated places in Chenaran County